Bemowo is a metro station on the western part of Line M2 of the Warsaw Metro. It is located in the vicinity of Górczewska and Powstańców Śląskich streets, in Bemowo district.

Description

The construction of the station began in 2019. It was previously named in design documents as Powstańców Śląskich.

The station opened for passenger service on 30 June 2022. The station was designed by a consortium of the Metroprojekt and the AMC Andrzej M. Chołdzyński architectural firms. Like the neighbouring station to its east, Ulrychów station, Bemowo station keeps a brick- and green-colour colour theme.

The interior walls of the metro station are made out of weathering steel. The station platform is 459 m in length, and has a cubic capacity of 224 586 m³.

References

External links

ZTM Municipal Transport Authority website - Warsaw Metro page

Railway stations in Poland opened in 2022
Line 2 (Warsaw Metro) stations